The following are the national records in track cycling in Suriname, maintained by its national cycling federation, Surinamese Wielren Unie.

Men

Women

References

Suriname
Records
Track cycling
track cycling